Rik Evens (21 February 1927 – 29 June 2022) was a Belgian professional road cyclist. He most notably won two stages of the 1950 Vuelta a España.

Major results
1949
 4th Overall Tour de l'Ouest
1st Stage 5
1950
 1st Stages 2 & 11 Vuelta a España
 4th Overall Ronde van Nederland
 5th Kampenhout–Charleroi–Kampenhout
 8th Omloop Het Volk

References

External links
 

1927 births
2022 deaths
Belgian male cyclists
People from Bree, Belgium
Belgian Vuelta a España stage winners
Cyclists from Limburg (Belgium)
20th-century Belgian people